Alma Johansson (1880–1974) was a Swedish missionary who worked in the city of Mush in the Ottoman Empire at the beginning of the 20th century.

Life 
In 1901, the Missionary Society of Swedish women sent Johansson to Mush (Western Armenia), where she stayed until December, 1915. There she worked for the German Hilfsbund-Orphanage for Armenian children. On the outbreak of World War I, the atrocities against the empire's Christian minorities escalated and she became an eyewitness to these crimes against humanity. She wrote about her experiences in a book called Ett folk i landsflykt: Ett år ur armeniernas historia ("A People in Exile: One Year in the Life of the Armenians", Stockholm: Kvinnliga missions arbetare, 1930), both of which were translated into Armenian and French.

She also made testimonies to German and American diplomats who published them later. Alma told about how women took poison so they wouldn't be captured by the Turks, and how the soldiers transported bloody, wounded women and children through the city while other soldiers fired at them just to frighten. When the wounded fell to the ground, the soldiers would hit them with the butt ends of their rifles. "I can never forget the sight. And nothing could you do for them!" she wrote.

She gave information about how the kids at the orphanage were handed over to a Turkish officer, and then taken to a building outside the city where they all were murdered.

In 1923 Johansson moved to Salonika, and established a factory for more than 200 Armenian refugee women. She also founded an Armenian kindergarten and primary school in Charilaos (Greece).

In 1997, the Johansson festival was organized in Yerevan.

In 2005, on the 90th anniversary of the Armenian genocide, a group of Swedish Armenians visited Alma Johansson's grave at Skogskyrkogården in Enskede, outside Stockholm, to remember these horrifying events and to honour her efforts. This commemoration has since the become a standing event and part of the annual commemoration program.

The film "Map of Salvation" (2015) tells about Johansson and four European humanist women's lives and activities.

See also

Witnesses and testimonies of the Armenian genocide

References

Sources
Artsvi Bakhchinyan, Armenia-Sweden: Historical and cultural relations, Yerevan, 2006, pp. 102–103 
Amalia Lange, Ett blad ur Armeniens historia, Stockholm, 1920, pp. 31–34
 http://www.azad-hye.com/nuke/modules.php?name=News&file=article&sid=173

Further reading 
 

1880 births
1974 deaths
Swedish Protestant missionaries
Witnesses of the Armenian genocide
Female Christian missionaries
Protestant missionaries in the Ottoman Empire
Protestant missionaries in Turkey
Burials at Skogskyrkogården